Suk Samran is a district (amphoe) of Ranong province, southern Thailand.

History
The district was created on 1 April 1992 by splitting off the southern part of Kapoe district. On 15 May 2007, all 81 minor districts were upgraded to full districts. On 24 August the upgrade became official
.

Geography
Neighboring districts are (from the north clockwise) Kapoe of Ranong Province, Ban Ta Khun of Surat Thani province, and Khura Buri of Phang Nga province. To the west is the Andaman Sea.

The eastern half of the district is part of the Khlong Nakha Wildlife Sanctuary.

Administration
The district is divided into two sub-districts (tambons), which are further subdivided into 13 villages (muban). There are no municipal (thesaban) areas, and two tambon administrative organizations (TAO).

References

External links
amphoe.com

Districts of Ranong province